"Slow Twistin'" is a song written by Jon Sheldon, and recorded by American rock and roll musicians Chubby Checker and Dee Dee Sharp (the latter being uncredited on the single and early albums).  Released as a single in 1962, it peaked at number 3 on both the Billboard Hot 100 and the R&B singles chart.

The song was covered by The Marvelettes (as "Slow Twist") on their 1962 album The Marvelettes Sing (aka Smash Hits of '62).

A different version of Slow Twistin’, with lead vocals by Dee Dee Sharp and featuring Chubby Checker, and with different lyrics, appeared on Dee Dee Sharp’s 1962 LP It’s Mashed Potato Time.

Songs about dancing
Twist (dance)
1962 songs
1962 singles
Cameo-Parkway Records singles
Cashbox number-one singles
Chubby Checker songs
Dee Dee Sharp songs
Songs with lyrics by Kal Mann